Qaleh-ye Sheykh Jasem (also Romanized as Qal‘eh-ye Sheykh Jāsem) is a village in Shoaybiyeh-ye Gharbi Rural District, Shadravan District, Shushtar County, Khuzestan Province, Iran. At the 2006 census, its population was 428, in 75 families.

References 

Populated places in Shushtar County